Cosmopolitan High School is an English-medium school, affiliated with the Maharashtra State Board of Secondary and Higher Secondary Education. It is located in Mira-Bhayandar, Mumbai, India. It was founded in 1989 and managed by ANA Education Trust.

History 
It was founded in 1989 by Neelam Pathak.

Affiliation 
The school is affiliated to the Maharashtra State Board of Secondary and Higher Secondary Education.

Other 
Mariyam Asif Siddiqui, a student of Cosmopolitan High School won the Bhagavad Gita Champion League, organised by ISKCON.

References

External links 
 Official website

High schools and secondary schools in Mumbai
Private schools in Mumbai
Primary schools in India
Educational institutions established in 1989
1989 establishments in Maharashtra